During the late evening of Friday, December 10, 2021, a violent, long-tracked EF4 tornado moved across Western Kentucky, producing severe to catastrophic damage in numerous towns, including Mayfield, Princeton, Dawson Springs, and Bremen. Crossing through eleven counties of the Jackson Purchase and Western Coal Field regions during its almost three-hour lifespan, the tornado was exceptionally long-tracked, traveling  while at times becoming wrapped in rain. It was the deadliest and longest-tracked tornado in an outbreak that produced numerous strong tornadoes in several states; 57 fatalities were confirmed in the tornado. The second significant tornado in an exceedingly long-tracked tornado family, this tornado began just inside northern Obion County, Tennessee, a few miles after another long-tracked EF4 tornado which traveled through northeast Arkansas, the Missouri Bootheel, and northwest Tennessee dissipated in western Obion County.

Meteorological synopsis

Tornado summary

Formation and rapid strengthening

The tornado began in the community of Woodland Mills in Obion County, Tennessee along Woodland Mills Road at 8:54 p.m. CST (02:54 UTC), produced by the same supercell that had previously produced another violent long-tracked tornado that affected northeast Arkansas, the Missouri Bootheel, and northwest Tennessee, near Reelfoot Lake. After the dissipation of that tornado in Obion County northeast of Samburg, the supercell produced three weak, brief tornadoes before this one formed several miles to the northeast. 

The tornado initially caused minor damage to trees and roofs as it moved through the north side of Woodland Mills, crossing SR 5. After moving northeast a half mile (0.8 km), it crossed the Tennessee–Kentucky state line near the community of State Line in Fulton County, causing additional tree damage rated EF0. The total damage caused by the tornado in Tennessee was estimated at $25,000 (2021 USD).

Farther to the northeast, the tornado reached EF2 strength, tearing roofs off homes, damaging or destroying outbuildings, and damaging irrigation equipment. Soon after, the tornado became violent and directly impacted the small community of Cayce at EF4 intensity, where multiple homes and small businesses were damaged or destroyed, with some that were leveled or swept clean from their foundations. A music venue housed in an old school building was badly damaged, and the Cayce Volunteer Fire Department building was totally destroyed, with the metal beams of the structure being severely twisted, while pieces of heavy machinery were tossed around. Several outbuildings and mobile homes were also obliterated in the Cayce area. One fatality occurred in Cayce, and several other people were injured.

After moving to the northeast of Cayce, the tornado weakened but still remained strong as it moved through rural areas to the northeast of town at EF3 intensity, destroying barns and a cell tower, and tearing the roof and exterior walls from a house. The tornado moved into Hickman County and appeared to intensify dramatically as it crossed US 51, where extreme ground scouring occurred in nearby fields. The tornado scoured multiple trenches into the ground in this area, with all grass and several inches of topsoil removed in the worst affected areas. However, no structures were impacted near US 51, and no rating was applied to the intense scouring. EF3 damage continued past this point as homes and metal truss towers were destroyed. EF2 damage was noted as it tracked into Graves County, closely paralleling Purchase Parkway (Future I-69) and US 45 directly toward the city of Mayfield. A house along KY 339 had its roof torn off, and many trees and power poles were downed in this area.

Mayfield

The National Weather Service issued a tornado emergency for Mayfield at 9:26 p.m. CST (03:26 UTC) as the now-massive wedge tornado approached the town from the southwest. As the tornado entered Mayfield, it regained EF4 intensity, and numerous homes were damaged or destroyed along Cardinal Road, some of which were leveled or swept from their foundations. Trees in this area were debarked and denuded, cars were thrown, and mobile homes were obliterated. EF4 damage continued after the tornado crossed over Mayfield Bypass (US 45 Bypass/I-69), where Mayfield Consumer Products, a candle factory where approximately 110 employees were working, was flattened. The large metal-framed warehouse building completely collapsed, trapping many employees and resulting in eight deaths and numerous injuries. Allegedly, workers' jobs had been threatened if they left the factory between the first and second tornado warnings for the areaa tornado warning had been issued earlier that evening at approximately 5:30 p.m. CSTand then again after the second tornado warning was issued after 9:00 p.m. CST. Several other industrial businesses were also damaged or destroyed near the candle factory, while semi-trucks and other industrial vehicles were thrown and destroyed as well, some of which were left unrecognizable.

Afterward, the tornado intensified even further, reaching high-end EF4 intensity as it moved along US 45 and tore directly through the center of Mayfield, resulting in widespread, catastrophic damage throughout the historic downtown square, listed on the National Register of Historic Places for its late Victorian and Classical Revival architecture. Most of the structures in downtown Mayfield were heavily damaged or destroyed, including multiple large, well-built, multi-story brick buildings that completely collapsed. Only large piles of bricks and lumber remained in the hardest-hit portions of the downtown area, and streets were left buried under debris. The large and well-constructed Graves County Courthouse had much of its roof torn off, its clock tower collapsed, and it had some of its exterior upper-floor walls knocked down. Several restaurants, an indoor soccer facility, a barber shop, automotive business, gym, bank, movie theatre, health and rehab center, and many other businesses were destroyed in downtown Mayfield. Large metal silos were crumpled and heavily damaged at a granary, and the large Mayfield water tower was toppled and destroyed. The post office, city hall, fire station, and police station were also significantly damaged or destroyed, and the emergency operations center lost the ability to transmit radio communications. Three large churches were destroyed in downtown Mayfield, including the First Presbyterian Church, a large and well-built brick structure that was mostly leveled. The First Christian Church sustained collapse of its domed roof and upper walls, while the First United Methodist Church's sanctuary, which was constructed with very thick masonry exterior walls, collapsed. A school bus garage, metal industrial buildings, and apartment buildings also sustained major structural damage or were destroyed in other areas of town. The tornado continued to devastate residential areas, levelling or sweeping homes from their foundations. Many trees continued to be denuded and debarked. Cars were thrown hundreds of yards and mangled. Dual polarization radar imagery showed that the tornado had lofted debris up to  into the air as it impacted the city. 22 people were killed in and around Mayfield, with hundreds more injured, many severely.

Marshall, Lyon, and Caldwell counties
After leaving Mayfield, the tornado weakened, producing damage at EF2 to EF3 strength and continuing northeast along I-69 and KY 58. A hangar and some small airplanes were destroyed at the Mayfield Graves County Airport, and multiple homes were badly damaged. A church and a business were damaged nearby, and further weakening occurred further to the northeast, where EF0 to EF1 damage to trees and structures was noted. It then intensified again as it approached and crossed the Marshall County line along I-69 before moving through the northwestern and northern outskirts of Benton, damaging or destroying many homes, garages, and outbuildings, downing numerous trees and power lines, and flipping RV campers. Most of the damage through this section of Marshall County ranged from EF2 to EF3 in intensity, though a few homes to the southwest of Benton were leveled or swept from their foundations at high-end EF3 strength. Damage continued through the Briensburg community at EF2 intensity, where homes near and along US 68 sustained partial to total roof loss, outbuildings were damaged or destroyed, and a metal truss tower collapsed. Past Briensburg, EF3 damage was noted along Lowery Road, where a poorly anchored home was leveled, and a few other homes sustained EF2 damage along this segment of the path.

The tornado again reached EF4 intensity as it tore directly through the small community of Cambridge Shores, located along the western shore of Kentucky Lake. Numerous homes were completely leveled in Cambridge Shores, including multiple large lakeside homes that were flattened or swept away. Numerous large trees were snapped, denuded, and debarked, and vehicles were thrown in this area. A fire department building had its roof torn off, and large metal boat storage buildings were also destroyed. The tornado then weakened but remained intense as it crossed over Kentucky Lake into Lyon County and moved through the Land Between the Lakes National Recreation Area, mowing down a large swath of trees and snapping power poles at EF3 strength as it passed near Twin Lakes before crossing Lake Barkley. After crossing Lake Barkley, the tornado continued at EF3 strength as it crossed KY 93 and I-24 near the eastern shore of the lake, where many additional homes sustained major damage or were destroyed, including several that were leveled or swept from their foundations.

Soon after, it intensified again and crossed into Caldwell County along  KY 293, producing EF4 damage as it impacted the south edge of Princeton, where another tornado emergency was issued. Dozens of homes were destroyed along the southern and southeastern fringes of town, especially at the Princeton Golf and Country Club subdivision, where several houses were leveled or swept away. The University of Kentucky Research Center was destroyed, with metal roof trusses carried hundreds of yards from the structure and wrapped around trees. Cars were thrown from the parking lot into adjacent fields, metal light poles were ripped from their concrete footings, and ground scouring was noted as well. Trees were stripped of their limbs and partially debarked in and around Princeton, barns and farm buildings were obliterated, livestock was killed, and cycloidal markings were left in fields outside of town. Four fatalities occurred in Princeton, along with numerous injuries. The tornado then followed US 62, producing EF2 to EF3 damage to homes in the small communities of Lewistown and Midway.

Dawson Springs, Barnsley, and Bremen

Past Midway, the tornado became violent and reached EF4 strength again as it moved along US 62, producing catastrophic damage as it made a direct hit on the city of Dawson Springs, located along the Caldwell–Hopkins county line. A fourth tornado emergency was in effect for Dawson Springs and St. Charles as the storm moved through the area. Residential areas in the northern part of Dawson Springs were devastated, with entire blocks of homes destroyed, many of which were leveled or swept from their foundations. Cars were thrown, copious amounts of structural debris were strewn in all directions, countless trees were shredded and debarked, and only rubble remained in the hardest-hit neighborhoods. The Dawson Village apartment complex was totally destroyed, and several two-story brick apartment buildings sustained EF4 damage there, being largely reduced to rubble with only a few first-floor interior walls left intact. Numerous vehicles were thrown into piles in the parking lot of the complex. Several duplexes were destroyed at Clarkdale Court, including one that was leveled with only a pile of debris remaining. An American Legion post and a car wash were flattened, while a church and a medical clinic sustained major damage. Some logistics facilities and warehouses were leveled in an industrial park as the tornado exited town, and several metal self-storage unit buildings and large garages were obliterated nearby. 14 people were killed in the Dawson Springs area, and many others were injured. A mother and her three children survived with relatively minor injuries by hanging on to a mattress as they were thrown 200 feet through the air into a field after the tornado swept their Dawson Springs home from its foundation. A photograph was lofted from a destroyed house in Dawson Springs and transported almost  by the intense tornadic updrafts, eventually being found in New Albany, Indiana. South-southwest of Dawson Springs, a group of storm chasers photographed a possible satellite tornado associated with the parent tornado. However, the National Weather Service did not confirm this.

Weakening slightly to high-end EF3 strength but continuing to cause major damage, the tornado tracked to the northeast beyond Dawson Springs, passing north of Ilsley and through the rural community of Carbondale. Farm outbuildings and mobile homes were demolished, and multiple houses sustained major damage or were destroyed, some of which of which were flattened. Additional high-end EF3 damage occurred and another tornado emergency was issued as it moved through Barnsley, just south of Earlington and Helca and just north of Mortons Gap. Almost every house in the small community was damaged or destroyed, including some that were leveled, though they were not well-constructed. A train on the CSX freight line adjacent to US 41 in the town derailed, and 25 multi-ton freight cars were derailed, several of which were thrown from the tracks, including one that was tossed into a house. Thousands of large trees were mowed down, and vehicles were flipped. Past Barnsley, the tornado crossed over another CSX freight line and I-69 before passing through an unpopulated swampy area, where more large trees were snapped or uprooted, and damage was rated EF2.

Continuing into northern Muhlenberg County, yet another tornado emergency was issued for the community of Bremen as the tornado approached from the southwest. It abruptly intensified to high-end EF4 strength as it crossed and paralleled KY 175 through the north side of town. Many homes were destroyed along this portion of the path, including several that were obliterated and completely swept away, with little debris remaining. Large trees sustained severe denuding and debarking, grass was scoured from the ground, and vehicles were thrown through the air and severely mangled. Some of the worst damage in Bremen occurred along Bethlehem Cemetery Road, where a row of four homes were obliterated, with debris scattered and wind-rowed long distances through fields across the street. Concrete floor slabs were torn from the foundation of one home and shattered, while the paved driveway of another residence was cracked and scoured. Houses that were farther away from the center of the damage path sustained roof and exterior wall loss, while mobile homes, barns, garages, and outbuildings were also destroyed. Bethlehem Baptist Church had one of its brick exterior walls blown out and was shifted off of its foundation slightly, while Church Street General Baptist Church lost much of its roof. A total of 11 people were killed in and around Bremen, and others were injured. Among the fatalities was District Judge Brian Crick, who represented Muhlenberg and McLean counties, as confirmed in a statement from the Supreme Court of Kentucky on December 11. Some weakening occurred, but significant damage continued after the tornado exited Bremen and crossed US 431 south of Stroud, where some homes and mobile homes were damaged or destroyed, and hundreds of large trees were snapped and denuded. Damage in this area was rated EF2 to low-end EF3.

Later damage and dissipation

Passing near the Muhlenberg–McLean county line, the tornado weakened substantially as it crossed into Ohio County at 11:10 p.m. (05:10 UTC), producing EF1 damage as it traversed rugged, hilly terrain to the west of Centertown. It moved through an abandoned coal strip mine, overturning a large section of a coal conveyor belt, snapping many trees, and downing power poles. A few farm outbuildings were also damaged or destroyed in this area. It became strong again north of Centertown along KY 85, producing EF2 damage as multiple homes and outbuildings were damaged or destroyed, including a well-built house that had much of its roof torn off and sustained collapse of an exterior wall. Five large chicken houses were destroyed, and hundreds of large hardwood trees were snapped and uprooted along a quarter-mile wide swath along this section of the path. Weakening back to EF1 intensity, the tornado downed trees along Carter Ferry Road and Mud College Road.

The tornado entered a flatter area to the west of Hartford and began to intensify once more, and large steel power poles were bent over or broken along Johnson School Road, earning an EF3 rating. It crossed US 231, I-165, and KY 69 north of Hartford, along with the Rough River three times. Homes and businesses sustained significant EF3 damage in this area, and two tractor-trailers were lifted and thrown , with one of the cabs being badly mangled. Large barns and garages were completely demolished, and a small brick office structure was destroyed, along with homes, very large silos, and a fertilizer storage facility. The last area of EF3-strength damage occurred along KY 69 and Utley Drive northeast of Hartford, where a poorly-anchored block-foundation home was swept away and completely destroyed, and other houses nearby sustained total loss of their roofs and exterior walls. Two anchored mobile homes were also swept away and destroyed, with their frames tossed and bent, one of which was thrown . An RV camper was thrown  in this area as well, landing upside down, while tractors and large hay bales were also thrown considerable distances. Damage of up to high-end EF2 intensity occurred beyond this point as the tornado crossed Humble Valley Road, Halls Creek Road, and Mount Vernon Road before passing north of Olaton. Homes were significantly damaged, barns and mobile homes were destroyed, a cow was killed, and thousands of large hardwood trees were downed. The tornado paralleled the Ohio–Grayson county line, and very briefly crossed a bend in the Rough River into Grayson County. Hundreds of trees were downed along Cane Ford Road, and an abandoned trailer home was destroyed.

The tornado then crossed KY 54, where the last area of EF2 damage occurred, as a frail home was destroyed and left with only a few walls standing, and large trees were snapped, one of which fell on and destroyed a car. Some outbuildings were also damaged or destroyed in this area. Entering Breckinridge County at EF1 intensity, it paralleled the Breckinridge–Grayson county line and passed over KY 110 northwest of Falls of Rough. Hundreds of trees were downed in this area, and a couple of structures sustained minor damage. It downed power lines as it crossed KY 79 at EF0 strength, where it damaged a large boat storage facility and scattered debris  to the northeast, across the runway of a small airport. Minor tree damage occurred before the tornado finally dissipated near Park Drive in Grayson County at 11:48 p.m.

The path was the ninth longest in recorded history. With a confirmed death toll of 57, it was the deadliest single tornado in the United States since the Joplin, Missouri tornado on May 22, 2011, ten years earlier. A 58th fatality was the result of a heart attack while clearing debris and is listed as indirect.

Possible EF5 intensity
In 2022, Timothy Marshall, a meteorologist, structural and forensic engineer; Zachary B. Wienhoff, with Haag Engineering Company; Christine L. Wielgos, a meteorologist at the National Weather Service of Paducah; and Brian E. Smith, a meteorologist at the National Weather Service of Omaha, published a damage survey of portions of the tornado’s track, particularly through Mayfield and Dawson Springs. The report notes that “the tornado damage rating might have been higher had more wind resistant structures been encountered. Also, the fast forward speed of the tornado had little ‘dwell’ time of strong winds over a building and thus, the damage likely would have been more severe if the tornado were slower.”

Impacts

Casualties 
The Western Kentucky tornado killed 57 people and resulted in between 508 and 533 injuries (according to figures from the National Weather Service in Paducah, Kentucky). The toll makes it the deadliest tornado ever recorded in the United States in the month of December, in addition to being the deadliest tornado since 2011. The tornado produced those 57 fatalities in multiple locations along its extended damage path, killing 24 people in Graves County (which also saw more than 200 of the total injuries), 15 in Hopkins County, 11 in Muhlenberg County, 4 in Caldwell County, and 1 person each in Fulton, Marshall, and Lyon counties. A later 58th fatality was the result of a heart attack while clearing debris and is listed as indirect.

Damage 
Damage totals vary by source, but the tornado produced profound destruction in multiple communities. In Mayfield, according to the National Weather Service, more than 4,000 structures were impacted (damaged or destroyed), including 3,778 residences, 183 commercial buildings, and 103 other structures. The tornado destroyed primarily low-income rental housing units, leading to a depleted stock of affordable housing in the city; the Mayfield Housing Authority reported that it had more than 700 requests for one-bedroom units almost a year after the tornado.

In Marshall County, containing the heavily-damaged community of Cambridge Shores, 356 structures were destroyed or 'made uninhabitable', and 341 more sustained light or moderate damage.

Response and recovery
On December 11, Kentucky governor Andy Beshear declared a state of emergency for parts of western Kentucky, followed that same day by President Joe Biden's approval of a federal emergency disaster declaration for the state of Kentucky. Beshear also announced the creation of a tornado relief fund and asked people to donate blood, as donated blood was running low throughout the pandemic. On December 15, Mayor of Mayfield Kathy Stewart O’Nan said that recovery efforts would continue.  The NWS office in Paducah requested mental health officers be there to assist the meteorologists due to potential trauma from assessing the path of devastation from the tornado.

The tornado's major impacts on Graves County Court operations—including the destruction of the courthouse in Mayfield—led the Kentucky Supreme Court to suspend the county's court operations (including physical and electronic court filings) between December 13, 2021 and January 11, 2022.

On December 12, FEMA Administrator Deanne Criswell and Department of Homeland Security Secretary Alejandro Mayorkas visited areas of Graves and Marshall counties, met with emergency management officials and responders, and held a media briefing with Governor Beshear. Their visit was followed three days later by a presidential trip: President Biden flew to Kentucky and toured Mayfield and Dawson Springs on December 15, meeting survivors. Describing the damage as "almost beyond belief," his brief remarks there included an announcement that the disaster declaration had been amended to have the federal government cover the entire cost of debris removal, as well as overtime for law enforcement and emergency personnel for the next month.

The Mayfield Messenger, the city's main newspaper, began printing an extra 2,000 copies per printing run of its paper, distributing them for free around the town.

By February 14, 2022, the U.S. Army Corps of Engineers had cleared more than 280,000 cubic yards of debris in Graves County alone, including Mayfield; by April 4, that number had risen to 265,453 cubic yards of debris removed in Mayfield and 433,408 cubic yards in total in Graves County.

Relief 
Governor Beshear's administration created the Team Western Kentucky Tornado Relief Fund, which received approximately 150,000 individual donations for a total of $52 million.

Disaster relief and humanitarian groups such as the American Red Cross, The Salvation Army, and World Vision collected donations and provided aid after the tornado. More than 4,500 people attended a tornado relief concert in August 2022.

Rebuilding 
In June 2022, the Mayfield City Council put several blocks in the city's heavily impacted downtown under a building permit freeze as they strategized how to rebuild in the area, before rezoning the area in December 2022 for "less restrictive" commercial and residential mixed-use development. In December 2022, a temporary memorial was placed in the Mayfield court square.

In February 2023, Mayfield mayor Kathy O’Nan visited Louisville, Mississippi, which was also struck by a devastating EF4 tornado in 2014, to tour the damage path and speak with city leaders about the rebuilding process and funding sources.

Mayfield candle factory lawsuit 
Accusations that factory management prohibited workers from leaving the candle factory in Mayfield before the tornado struck were reported on December 13. Workers said they were told by management that "if you leave, you’re more than likely to be fired." On December 17, it was reported that multiple workers at the candle factory filed a lawsuit against Mayfield Consumer Products in state court, seeking compensation and punitive damages. The lawsuit alleges that the factory had up to three and a half hours to let workers leave as safety precautions and did not, and the company showed a "flagrant indifference to the rights of workers" and violated the Kentucky occupational safety and health workplace standards, by refusing evacuations. The following January, the factory closed and Mayfield Consumer Products laid off approximately 250 workers there, shifting operations and the remaining workers to a new plant in the nearby town of Hickory.

See also

List of North American tornadoes and tornado outbreaks
 List of F4 and EF4 tornadoes (2020–present)
Weather of 2021
Tornado intensity and damage
Tornado records
Tri-State tornado outbreak
Tornado outbreak of December 10–11, 2021

References

Western, Kentucky
2021 in Kentucky
Tornado,2021-12-10, Western Kentucky
Western Kentucky Tornado
Tornadoes in Kentucky
F4 tornadoes

External links